New York Inter was an American soccer club based in New York City that was a member of the American Soccer League.

In 1964/65, the club joined the "super-league" Eastern Professional Soccer Conference. After the EPSC folded at the end of its only season, the team moved to the ASL and became known simply as Inter S.C.. After the 1965/66 season, the club became New York Inter again.

Year-by-year

Inter
Defunct soccer clubs in New York City
American Soccer League (1933–1983) teams